Paul Vilar (18 September 1898 – 8 January 1996) was a French author and writer of novels, tales and essays.

In 1960, he wrote the lyrics for the song Les Étangs de Sologne with the music by Henri Betti which was sung the same year by Jean Philippe in the TV show Toute la Chanson.

Books written by Paul Vialar
 Fatôme (1931)
 J'avais un camarade (1936)
  Soir, pièce en 1 acte... [Paris, Radio-Paris, 20 février 1938] (1938)
 La Rose de la mer (1939)
 La maison sous la mer (1941)
 La grande meute (1943)
 La Caille (1945)
 Job (1946)
 Une ombre (1946)
 Le voilier des Îles (livre pour enfants, 1947)
 La mort est un commencement (Grand Prix de la Ville de Paris, 1948) 8 vol. :
 Le Bal des sauvages
 Le Clos des trois maisons
 Le Petit Jour
 Les Morts vivants
 Risques et périls
 La Carambouille
 Dansons la capucine
 La Haute Mort
 Écrit sur le sable (1948)
 Le Château du hasard (1948)
 Le bon Dieu sans confession (sous-titre : Monsieur Dupont est mort) (1949)
 Le Bouc étourdi (1949). Les Bibliophiles de France 
 La Grande Ribaude (1951) 
 L'Éperon d'argent (1951)
 La Chasse aux hommes (1952/1953) 10 vol. :
 Le Rendez-vous
 La Bête de chasse
 Les Brisées hautes
 Le Bien-aller
 Les Faux-fuyants
 Les Odeurs et les sons
 Le Débucher
 Les Fins dernières
 L'Hallali
 La Curée
 Chronique française du XXe siècle (1955/1961) 10 vol. publiés chez Del Duca :
 Les étoiles de Mars (1955)
 Place de la République (ou Les députés) (1956)
 Rideau (1956)
 La boutiquière (1957)
 Belada, éditeur (1957)
 Pas de pitié pour les cobayes (1958)
 Pas de temps pour mourir (1958)
 Les robes noires (1958)
 Les Zingari (Ceux du cirque) (1959)
 La farine du diable (1961)
 Cinq hommes de ce monde  (1954)
 Le Roman des Oiseaux de Chasse, Flammarion (1958)
 Le Temps des imposteurs
 Le fusil à deux coups (1960)
 L'homme de chasse (1961)
 La Jeunesse du monde (1966)
 Lettre ouverte à un jeune sportif
 La Cravache d'or (1968)(voir Yves Saint-Martin)
 Les Invités de la chasse (1969)
 Plumes dans le vent (illustrations de Henri de Linares)
 La Croule (1974)
 L'Enfant parmi les hommes (souvenirs, 1990)

People from Saint-Denis, Seine-Saint-Denis
1898 births
1996 deaths
20th-century French poets
20th-century French dramatists and playwrights
20th-century French novelists
Prix Femina winners
HEC Paris alumni
Commandeurs of the Légion d'honneur
French children's writers
Recipients of the Croix de Guerre 1914–1918 (France)
20th-century French male writers